Callistus Rubaramira (born 8 February 1950), is a Roman Catholic priest, who is the Bishop of the Roman Catholic Diocese of Kabale, in Uganda. He was appointed bishop on 15 March 2003.

Early life and priesthood
Rubaramira was born on 8 February 1950, at Rubira-Kyanamira Village, in present-day Kabale District in the Western Region of Uganda. He was ordained priest on 18 May 1975 at Kabale. He served as priest in the Roman Catholic Diocese of Kabale until 15 March 2003.

As bishop
He was appointed bishop of the Roman Catholic Diocese of Kabale, on 15 March 2003. He was consecrated as bishop on 8 June 2003 at Kabale by Bishop Robert Marie Gay†, Bishop Emeritus of Kabale, assisted by Bishop Barnabas Rugwizangonga Halem ’Imana†, Bishop Emeritus of Kabale and Archbishop Paul Kamuza Bakyenga, Archbishop of Mbarara.

See also
 Uganda Martyrs
 Roman Catholicism in Uganda

Succession table

References

External links
Priests Warned Against Defiance  As of 22 August 2016.
Radio Maria Substation in Kabale, Uganda Inaugurated As of 8 December 2017. 

1950 births
Living people
21st-century Roman Catholic bishops in Uganda
People from Kabale District
Roman Catholic bishops of Kabale